Paolo Farinola (born 22 February 1984) is a Brazilian-Greek professional footballer who plays as a winger for Football League club Egaleo.

References

1984 births
Living people
Apollon Smyrnis F.C. players
Greek footballers
Greek people of Brazilian descent
Association football wingers